Air Marshal (retd.) Muhammad Enamul Bari is a former Bangladesh Air Force officer whose last assignment before retiring was the 13th Chief of Air Staff of Bangladesh Air Force. He retired on June 12, 2015 after over 30 years of service. He also served as the Chairman of Biman Bangladesh Airlines, the flag carrier of Bangladesh for nearly four years. He was replaced by Sajjadul Hassan as the chairperson of Bangladesh Biman.

References

 

Bangladesh Air Force air marshals
Living people
Chiefs of Air Staff (Bangladesh)
Year of birth missing (living people)